Radial Road 4 (R-4), informally known as the R-4 Road, is a network of roads and bridges that all together form the fourth arterial road of Metro Manila in the Philippines.

Route description

Pasig Line Street 
R-4 begins as Pasig Line Street in San Andres district from the intersection with Pedro Gil Street to where it connects to Kalayaan Avenue at the city's border with Makati. This segment of R-4 is named for the old Manila Electric Railway line destroyed and abandoned after World War II which connected Manila with San Joaquin, Pasig.

Kalayaan Avenue 

The segment of R-4 in Makati is known as Kalayaan Avenue. It follows the former Pasig Line of the Manila Electric Railway from Tejeros at the intersection with Zobel Roxas Street to East Rembo at the intersection with J.P. Rizal Avenue Extension. A portion of this segment of R-4 is non-contiguous as part of the former railroad has been converted into a residential street within the gated community of Bel-Air Village. East of Epifanio de los Santos Avenue (C-4), it forms the northern boundary of Bonifacio Global City and continues east towards Makati's border with Pasig near the Napindan Hydraulic Control Structure.

M. Concepcion Avenue 
Between the Buting Bridge over the Taguig River, which serves as the Makati-Pasig boundary, to R. Jabson Street in San Joaquin, R-4 is known as M. Concepcion Avenue. It passes through the San Guillermo Parish Church in Buting and Manggahan Shrine just north of the municipality of Pateros before merging with Elisco Road past the R. Jabson-A. Luna Street junction.

Elisco Road 
R-4 is known as Elisco Road in the rest of the Pasig barangays of San Joaquin and Kalawaan. This road turns south upon arriving in Kalawaan and ends at the Taguig–Pateros boundary. It is unknown where R-4 would connect to Pinagbuhatan east of the Pasig River to continue its eastward journey to Taytay in Rizal.

Highway 2000 
R-4 picks up east of the Manggahan Floodway in Taytay and continues as Highway 2000 towards the Taytay poblacion of Dolores at the intersection with Taytay Diversion Road and Manila East Road (R-5). It is unknown if R-4 would follow the route of R-5 along Taytay Diversion Road or if R-4 would follow a different alignment or build a new road segment.

Notes

References 

Routes in Metro Manila